Nathaniel Dusk, a private investigator, is the titular protagonist of two four-issue-long comic-book miniseries by DC Comics. They appeared in 1984 and 1985 respectively.

Creation
Don McGregor wrote and Gene Colan provided pencils for both series. McGregor has said that he based Dusk on characters played by actor Robert Culp. He had been watching I Spy, a series starring Culp, when the idea of Nathaniel Dusk came into his mind.

Fictional character biography
Dusk operates out of New York City in the 1930s. He served in the United States armed forces in World War I and was hired by the New York City police force. Dusk fell in love with Joyce Gulino, a beautiful young saleswoman with two children, Jennie and Anthony. Gulino's ex-husband was a gangster named Joseph Costilino. Costilino later killed his family.

The 2017-2019 miniseries Doomsday Clock, by Geoff Johns and Gary Frank, portrays Nathaniel Dusk in the DC Universe as a noir film character portrayed by fictional actor Carver Colman. In 1954, Carver Colman is found bludgeoned to death with the award that he won. Colman having been the first actor whom Doctor Manhattan met after traveling to the DC Universe, he served as an "anchor" for Manhattan as he adjusted to life there.

Collected editions
 DC Through the 80s: The Experiments (Nathaniel Dusk #1, 504 pages, May 2021)

References

1984 comics debuts
Characters created by Don McGregor
Characters created by Gene Colan
Comics characters introduced in 1984
DC Comics titles
Detective comics
Fictional private investigators